Dogfall is an Australian play written by South Australian playwright Caleb Lewis, first produced in November 2007. Set in World War I, this absurdist play has an anti-war theme.

Plot and themes 
The play is set in 1916, during the Somme. Alone in their bunker Will, a soldier, and Jack, a medic, fight to survive the war whole. The battle shifts continuously, and the sky continues to fall... Dogfall depicts the absurdity of war; outside it is literally raining cats dogs, and other animals.

The two men are joined by "semi-pacifist" Alousha, and scenes from other theatres of war, notably Vietnam, Nanking, London, Guernica, Northern Ireland, Rwanda,  and Guantanamo Bay detention camp are portrayed. The plot is absurd but the themes complex and multi-layered.

Original production
The first production of this anti-war play was launched at the Bakehouse Theatre in Adelaide, South Australia from 2 to 17 November 2007. Critic Stephen Davenport described it as a "brilliant play" that was "disturbing and morbidly funny" and "superbly written by Caleb Lewis". US playwright Edward Albee, with whom Lewis had undertaken a two-week workshop, called the play "wonderful".

Cast 
The cast comprised:
Brendan Rock
Martin Hissey
Joseph Del Re

Crew 
Director: Justin McGuinness
Composer: Peter Nielsen
Lighting: Nic Mollison
Costume & Props: Tsubi Du
Publicity: Antje Guenther
Produced by: TheimaGen

2016 U.S. production
Dogfall was staged by Iron Age Theatre in Philadelphia, in the United States, in February 2016, directed by John Doyle.

References

2007 plays
Australian plays
Existentialist plays
Gulf War fiction
Plays set in Iraq
Kuwait in fiction
Plays set in France
Plays set in Russia
Plays set in Vietnam
Vietnam War fiction
Plays about World War I
Plays about World War II
Theatre of the Absurd